Hamza al-Ghamdi (also transliterated as Alghamdi) (November 18, 1980 – September 11, 2001) was one of five terrorist hijackers of United Airlines Flight 175 as part of the September 11 attacks.

Born in Saudi Arabia, Hamza al-Ghamdi left his family to fight in Chechnya and was probably sent to Al-Qaeda training camps in Afghanistan where he was chosen to participate in the 9/11 attacks.

He arrived in the United States in May 2001 on a tourist visa. On September 11, 2001, al-Ghamdi boarded United Airlines Flight 175 and hijacked the plane along with his brother Ahmed al-Ghamdi and 3 other terrorists so that lead hijacker and trained pilot Marwan al-Shehhi could crash the plane into the South Tower of the World Trade Center.

History 
Some reports say that al-Ghamdi left his home to fight in Chechnya against the Russians in early 2000. (Other reports say he left in January 2001.) He called home several times until late 2001, saying he was in Chechnya.

Known as Julaybeeb during the preparations, al-Ghamdi traveled to the United Arab Emirates some time in late 2000, where he purchased traveler's cheques presumed to have been paid for by Mustafa al-Hawsawi.  Five other hijackers also passed through the UAE and purchased traveller's cheques, including Majed Moqed, Saeed al-Ghamdi, Wail al-Shehri, Ahmed al-Haznawi and Ahmed al-Nami.

In January 2001, al-Ghamdi rented a post office box in Delray Beach, Florida with another hijacker, Mohand al-Shehri.  According to FBI director Robert Mueller and the 9/11 Commission however, al-Ghamdi did not first enter the United States until a London flight on May 28 with Mohand al-Shehri and Abdulaziz al-Omari.

In March 2001, al-Ghamdi was filmed in a farewell video that was aired on al Jazeera. In the video, many future 9/11 hijackers swear to become martyrs, although no details of the plot are revealed. Al-Ghamdi does not speak in the film, but is seen studying maps and flight manuals.

He was one of nine hijackers to open a SunTrust bank account with a cash deposit around June 2001. Al-Ghamdi also applied for and received a Florida driver's license on June 27, 2001. In the next two months, he obtained two duplicate licenses simply by filling out change-of-address forms. Five other suspected hijackers also received duplicate Florida licenses in 2001, and others had licenses in different states. Some have speculated that this was to allow multiple people to use the same identity.

Attacks 

Al-Ghamdi purchased his own eTicket for Flight 175 on August 29, using his Visa card. The FBI also claimed that he also purchased an eTicket for a "Flight 7950" from Los Angeles to San Francisco, although it does not give the projected date of flight.

On August 30, Hamza al-Ghamdi bought his brother, Ahmed al-Ghamdi, an identical eTicket for Flight 175 and bought them each one-way tickets on an AirTran flight on September 7, from Fort Lauderdale to Boston. However, al-Ghamdi instead went with Mohand al-Shehri to Newark, New Jersey on $139.75 tickets purchased from the Mile High Travel agency in Lauderdale-by-the-Sea.

Hamza and Ahmed al-Ghamdi stayed at the Charles Hotel in Cambridge, Massachusetts.  On September 8 they checked out of the hotel, and moved into the Days Inn on Soldiers Field Road in Brighton, Boston, Massachusetts where they remained up until the attacks.

On the morning of September 11, 2001, Hamza al-Ghamdi left the hotel with his brother. The two men shared a taxicab ride to Logan International Airport, where they boarded Flight 175. The brothers pushed the passengers and crew to the back of the plane while Fayez Banihammad and al-Shehri killed pilots Victor Saracini and Michael Horrocks, allowing al-Shehhi to take control of the plane.

Aftermath 
On September 22, 2001, Arab News reported that Hamza al-Ghamdi's father told the Al-Watan newspaper that an "FBI-released" photograph bore absolutely no resemblance to his son. However, the picture al-Ghamdi's father refers to is assumed to have not been a picture released by the FBI, as they did not make the hijacker's pictures available until September 27, 2001.

He appeared in a video released on September 8, 2006, that showed the planning of the attacks.

See also 
 Hijackers in the September 11 attacks
 PENTTBOM

References

External links 

 The Final 9/11 Commission Report

United Airlines Flight 175
2001 deaths
Saudi Arabian al-Qaeda members
Participants in the September 11 attacks
1980 births
Saudi Arabian mass murderers
Saudi Arabian murderers of children